The Breda Ba.19 was an Italian single-seat aerobatic biplane aircraft developed as an air force trainer in 1928.

Design and development
The Breda Ba.19 was a single-bay, unequal-span, unstaggered biplane of conventional configuration which seated its pilot in an open cockpit. A few Ba.19s were produced as two-seaters with a second open cockpit in tandem with the first.

Operational history
The Ba.19s were used throughout the 1930s for display flights by the Squadriglia di Alta Acrobazia Aerea, performing formation aerobatics.

Operators

Regia Aeronautica
Squadriglia di Alta Acrobazia Aerea

Specifications

See also

References
Notes

Bibliography

 Angelucci, Enzo. The Rand McNally Encyclopedia of Military Aircraft, 1914–1980. San Diego, California: The Military Press, 1983. .
 Taylor, Michael J. H. Jane's Encyclopedia of Aviation. London: Studio Editions, 1989, p. 195.

External links

 "Breda 19."

Ba.019
Single-engined tractor aircraft
1920s Italian military trainer aircraft
Biplanes
Aerobatic aircraft
Aircraft first flown in 1928